Dłużec  is a village in Gmina Wolbrom, Olkusz County, Lesser Poland Voivodeship, Poland.

References

Villages in Olkusz County